Vice Admiral Sir (Arthur) Gordon (Voules) Hubback KBE CB (11 September 1902 – 25 August 1970) was a Royal Navy officer who went on to be Fourth Sea Lord.

Early life

Gordon Hubback was born on 11 September 1902 to Margaret Rose Frances (Daisy) Voules and Arthur Benison Hubback who was working as an architect in Malaya. He was educated at the Royal Naval College, Osborne, and then at the Royal Naval College, Dartmouth. He was appointed captain on 15 May 1916.

Naval career

Hubback served in World War II at the Plans Division at the Admiralty where he helped plan the Norwegian campaign. After serving in various ships from 1940, he was appointed Commanding Officer of HMS Gregale in March 1943. In July of that year he joined the staff of the Commander-in-Chief, Eastern Fleet and in July 1944 he became Assistant Director of Plans at the Admiralty.

After the War he was given command of the cruiser HMS Glasgow before being appointed Commodore Superintendent at Malta in 1947 and then Commodore at the Royal Naval Barracks at Lee-on-the-Solent in 1950. He went on to be Admiral Superintendent at HM Naval Base Portsmouth in 1951. He was made Director of Dockyards at the Admiralty from 1954 to 1957. He was then appointed Fourth Sea Lord in 1958. Hubback was appointed a Companion of the Order of the Bath in 1953, and made a Knight Commander of the Order of the British Empire in 1957.

In retirement he became Managing Director of the newly privatised Bailey's Dockyard in Malta.

Personal life
Hubback married Elizabeth Pearson Rogers in 1930, with whom he had one son.  His first wife died in 1949, and he married Sheila Mary Roberton the same year.

References

External links

1902 births
1970 deaths
Royal Navy vice admirals
Knights Commander of the Order of the British Empire
Companions of the Order of the Bath
Lords of the Admiralty
People educated at the Royal Naval College, Osborne